is a velodrome located in Chiba City that conducts pari-mutuel Keirin racing - one of Japan's four authorized  where gambling is permitted. Its Keirin identification number for betting purposes is 32# (32 sharp).

Chiba's oval is 500 meters in circumference. A typical keirin race of 2,000 meters consists of four laps around the course.

External links
Chiba Keirin Home Page (Japanese)
keirin.jp Chiba Information (Japanese)

Velodromes in Japan
Cycle racing in Japan
Sports venues in Chiba (city)